("royal title" in Latin) is a statute of the Parliament of England issued in 1484 by which the title of King of England was given to Richard III.

The act ratified the declaration of the Lords and the members of the House of Commons a year earlier that the marriage of Edward IV of England to Elizabeth Woodville had been invalid and so their children, including Edward, Richard and Elizabeth, were illegitimate and thus debarred from the throne. Richard III had been proclaimed the rightful king. Since the Lords and the Commons had not been officially convened as a parliament, doubts had arisen as to its validity and so when Parliament convened, it enacted the declaration as a law.

After the death and overthrow of Richard III, the Act was repealed, which had the effect of reinstating the legitimacy of Edward IV and Elizabeth Woodville's children.

Contents

Edward's marriage was invalidated because Bishop Robert Stillington testified that the king had precontracted a marriage to Lady Eleanor Butler.

And how also, that at the time of contract of the same pretensed Marriage, and before and long time after, the said King Edward was and stood married and troth-plight to one Dame Eleanor Butler, Daughter of the old Earl of Shrewsbury, with whom the same King Edward had made a precontract of Matrimony, long time before he made the said pretensed Marriage with the said Elizabeth [Woodville] Grey, in manner and form above-said.

The document also claimed that Elizabeth Woodville and her mother had used witchcraft to get the king to marry her. Since Richard's brother George, Duke of Clarence, had been executed and attainted, his descendants forfeited all rights to the throne, leaving Richard the true heir. For good measure, the document also hinted that George and Edward (born in Ireland and Normandy, respectively) were themselves illegitimate and stated Richard, "born within this land" was the "undoubted son and heir of Richard, late Duke of York".

Edward's reign was also criticised, he was said to have led by "sensuality and concupiscence" and delighted in "adulation and flattery" and to have been easily influenced by "persons insolent, vicious and of inordinate avarice", a reference to the Woodville family. In contrast, Richard was said to have been a man distinguished by "great wit, prudence, justice, princely courage, and memorable and laudable acts in diverse battles."

Repeal
After Richard was killed in battle, the Act was repealed by the first parliament of the new king, Henry VII. The repeal was important because the new King and his supporters viewed Richard III's rule as a usurpation and also because Henry VII's prospective wife, Elizabeth of York, whom he had pledged to marry if he gained the throne, was the eldest daughter of Edward IV and Elizabeth Woodville and the Act had made her illegitimate.

Henry also ordered his subjects to destroy all copies of it and all related documents without reading them. His orders were carried out so well that only one copy of the law has ever been found. That copy was transcribed by a monastic chronicler into the Croyland Chronicle, where it was discovered by Sir George Buck more than a century later during the reign of James I.

The Repealing Act was passed in the first Parliament of Henry VII, stating that the original Titulus Regius was
void, adnulled, repelled, irrite [invalidated], and of noe force ne effecte and that the original be destroyed, and that any copies should be either destroyed or returned to Parliament on pain of fine and imprisonment.

A law report from his reign stated:
...that the said Bill, Act and Record, be annulled and utterly destroyed, and that it be ordained by the same Authority, that the same Act and Record be taken out of the Roll of Parliament, and be cancelled and brent ['burned'], and be put in perpetual oblivion.

Henry almost succeeded in suppressing the Titulus Regius. It was known that Richard had claimed that a marriage pre-contract invalidated Edward's sons' right to the throne, but it was not known who Edward's supposed "real" wife was. Thomas More assumed that the Act referred to Edward's longtime mistress, Elizabeth Lucy, a view that was repeated until Buck discovered the original document.

Edward IV's first son, though Titulus Regius annulled his reign, is still counted as Edward V to emphasize that Richard III was an usurper. Thus, Henry VII's grandson was numbered Edward VI.

See also
The Daughter of Time, 1951, by Elizabeth MacKintosh writing as Josephine Tey.

 Act of Accord (1461)

Notes

External links
 Original text of Titulus Regius

1484 in England
1480s in law
Acts of the Parliament of England
Succession to the British crown
Edward V of England
Richard III of England
Marriage, unions and partnerships in England
Wars of the Roses
Succession acts